Ghali Amdouni, known by the mononym Ghali (born 21 May 1993), is a Italian rapper and record producer. Born in Milan to Tunisian parents, he originally started his career using the pseudonym Fobia.

One of the leading figures in Italian rap at the end of the 2010s, he released two albums reaching the top 10 of the Italian charts supported by many successful hits, with six top positions in the FIMI chart, including "Happy Days", "Ninna Nanna", "Cara Italia", "Peace & Love" and "Good Times".

As of 2020 Ghali had sold over 1.6 million copies in Italy, collaborating with numerous Italian artists such as Fedez, Gué Pequeno, Sfera Ebbasta, Salmo, and international artists like Ed Sheeran, Stormzy and Travis Scott.

In October 2016, Ghali released his hugely successful single "Ninna nanna", solely on Spotify, becoming first single to debut at number one only with streaming, selling over 200,000 copies. The video also hit 100 million views on YouTube, a record for a debut Italian artist.

Besides the favor of the musical press, Ghali was also praised by Italy's literary scene and major newspapers, with writers like Roberto Saviano calling him "a blessing" in La Repubblica and Vanni Santoni praising his poetical skills in Il Corriere della Sera.
In 2017 his Album "Album" won the "Lunezia Rap Prize" for the musical-literary value.

Biography 
Born in Milan from Tunisian parents, he lived in Baggio, a suburb of the city. The rapper started to approach hip hop using the pseudonym Fobia, then became Ghali. In 2011 he joined Troupe D'Elite, a group that also included rapper Ernia. His colleague Gué Pequeno signed a contract on his label Tanta Roba, the singer who made himself known thanks to Fedez, accompanying him on his 2011 tour. The following year he releases with the group the EP homonyms, strongly criticized by critics as a disfigurement to Italian and international rap. In July 2013 Ghali released Leader Mixtape, collaborating with artists such as Sfera Ebbasta and Maruego. One year later Troupe D'Elite canceled their contract with Tanta Roba and released the album Il Mio Giorno Preferito, available for free download on the Honiro platform.

On October 14, 2016, through Sto Records, the debut single "Ninna nanna" was released on Spotify, which set new streaming records in Italy, achieving the highest number of listeners in the first day, and debuting at the top position of the Italian Singles Chart with 200,000 copies sold in total. On 3 February 2017 it was the turn of the second single "Pizza Kebab", reaching number 3 on the Fimi's chart, and on the following 12 May the hit "Happy Days" which reached number 4 and sold over 200,000 copies. On May 27, 2017 he released his first studio album, entitled Album, which debuted at the second position of the Italian Albums Chart and sold 150,000 copies. The album also debuted at number 24 of Swiss Album Charts and 96 of Belgium Albums Chart. At the same time, eight other of the album's tracks entered the Singles Chart, selling a total of over 325,000 certified copies. The last single "Habibi" peaked at number seven of FIMI's chart and received four platinum certifications.

On January 26, 2018 Ghali made the single "Cara Italia" available for streaming, becoming the second single to reach the first position in Italy, later receiving the three platinum certifications.  On April 20, 2018 was released 20 by Capo Plaza, which features the song "It was worth it" in collaboration with the rapper. A few weeks later it was the turn of a new unreleased single, "Peace & Love", released together with Sfera Ebbasta and producer Charlie Charles, which made his debut at the top of the Singles Chart and became a summer hit. Before summer the rapper released another single, "Zingarello", made with producer Sick Luke.

On September 28, 2018, "Habibi" was announced as part of the FIFA 19 soundtrack.

On March 15, 2019 it was the turn of the single "I Love You", becoming the rapper's ninth top 10 hit, while in June 21 two singles were released simultaneously, "Turbococco" and "Hasta la vista", which entered into the top 50. Ghali also participated in the second album by rapper Rkomi, Dove gli occhi non arrivano, on the track "Boogie Nights" and two international remixes of "Vossi Bop" by Stormzy and "Antisocial" with Ed Sheeran and Travis Scott.

On November 11, 2019 he released his tenth top 10 single, "Flashback", the first single from his upcoming second studio album. After the number one collaboration "Boogieman" with rapper Salmo, Ghali published the album DNA, characterized by more hip hop and pop music rather than trap sounds, which became his first number one album and received the gold certification. With the album he released the topper single "Good Times".

In June 2021, Ghali released the single "Chiagne Ancora" featuring LIBERATO and J Lord.

Personal life  
Ghali was born to Tunisian parents. His father was sent to prison when he was just a child and his mother raised him on her own. His mother fell ill with cancer at age 38 and then recovered. She is also his personal assistant, as of 2019.

Ghali is Muslim.

Philanthropy and rap feud 
Ghali's passion for rap and songwriting made him often misunderstood by his school mates: he said he was often bullied, but this experience strengthened him and pushed him to fight more and more.

In his second studio album on the track "Vossi Bop (Remiz)", with Stormzy, he raps, "Salvini dice che chi è arrivato col gommon non può stare .it ma stare .com (Salvini says that whoever came in the raft can't stay here but stay .com)" and defined the Italian Minister for the Interior, Matteo Salvini, as a fascist. Ghali justified himself :"I'm an artist and doing politics isn't necessarily my job. My music tells my story and rap, which began as a social denunciation and has always been my daily bread, was the best way to satisfy my need to take a position towards those who exploit fear to create an enemy. Stormzy talks about his disagreement with the situation in the UK, I do not agree with Salvini's thought and I found it right to express it through my art".

In January 2019 Ghali, Gué Pequeno, Sfera Ebbasta and Salmo criticized Fedez's album Paranoia Airlines, describing it as boring on Twitter and making negative comments by freestyle. In February 2020 in an interview with Il Messaggero, Ghali says:"Fedez? I toured with him in 2012. Then who didn't help me came to ask me duets. In this setting there is a lot of opportunism; [...] I remember when they told me you'll never do anything and you'll stay forever in the dark in a corner: it was Fedez who told me those things. So far there are no contacts. He tries to get close sometimes, but I try to avoid him". The rapper concluded: "Maybe I was wrong, because nobody knows how long and how much dedication is behind a record. If he makes a bad record next time, I'll avoid commenting on it."

Discography 

as part of Troupe D'Elite
2012: Troupe D'Elite EP (EP)
2014: Il mio giorno preferito (studio album)

Albums

Compilations

Mixtapes
2013: Leader Mixtape

Singles

Other charting songs

Featured in

References

Italian rappers
1993 births
Living people
Singers from Milan
Italian people of Tunisian descent
Italian Muslims